Russian Foreign Trade Academy of the Ministry of economic development of the Russian Federation, RFTA, (Всероссийская академия внешней торговли Министерства экономического развития Российской Федерации, ВАВТ Минэкономразвития России) is the only university which is subordinate to the Ministry of Economic Development of the Russian Federation.

For more than 90 years, RFTA has been training professionals for foreign economic activity. Graduates of the Academy become specialists in the field of international trade, international finance and international economic law.

In 2015, in accordance with the Decree of the President of the Russian Federation, the Academy was assigned to the leading universities that have the right to develop and approve educational standards for all levels of higher education independently. Since 2016, the main programs of the Academy have been implemented according to its own educational standards in the following areas of training: economics, management, law (bachelor's degree, master's degree, postgraduate studies), state municipal administration (bachelor's degree), advanced training programs and professional retraining programs.

Place 

RFTA Campus is formed by a number of educational and administrative buildings.

10-storey educational building (6A Vorobiovskoe Shosse) with spacious lecture and seminar rooms, fully equipped language laboratories. All rooms are equipped audio and video equipment. A conference hall for 164 seats. Equipped computer classes on the 9th floor. A refectory and a cafe on the 1st floor. Two level parking lot for 130 cars.

Dormitory A new 6-storey at 4A Pudovkina Street which houses a new dormitory of the Academy and it was put into operation in 2020.

RFTA Library In 2020, a new library building with comfortable reading rooms and a café, located at 8 bldg. 2 Vorobiovskoe Shosse was put into operation.

Sports and Recreation Center (SOK) 4-storey Sports and Recreation Center is located at 4A bldg.1 Pudovkina Street.

Medical center / Student Health Care The Medical Center is open daily, 7 days a week at 4A, bldg.1 Pudovkina Street.

History 
The history of the Academy is being made by the history of the thousands of its graduates, hundreds of its professors and staff members. We are proud of our graduates who were high up in the civil service and who at present fill top positions in the Presidential Administration, the Ministry of Economic Development and Trade of the Russian Federation, the Ministry of Energy, the Federal Tax Police Service of the Russian Federation, the Ministry of Agriculture of the Russian Federation, the Ministry of Foreign Affairs of the Republic of Belarus, the Bank of Russia, the Russian Fuel Union, etc. It is not an easy task just to list the names of the graduates of the Academy who served as Directors of Departments or Bureaus of foreign economic services, associations, as trade representatives and economic advisers, and those who were employed by international organizations.

And it is not an exaggeration to say that in many respects the graduates of the Academy have formed the basis of the Soviet and Russian foreign trade and still are one of its main columns.
Starting 1995, these are the undergraduate students who take the baton. The RFTA annually offers the Russian market professional economists, lawyers and international managers.

RFTA today 
The structure of the RFTA includes:

 five faculties: Faculty of International Economists (FIE), Faculty of International Finance (FIF), Faculty of Foreign Trade Management (FFTM), Faculty of International Law (FIL) and Faculty of International Business (FIB).
 seven research units: the Institute of International Economics and Finance, the Council for the Study of Productive Forces, the Center for Financial Monitoring, the Institute for Macroeconomic Research, the center for the development of program-oriented management, the Institute for the Development of Integration Processes, the center for data Analysis.
 higher courses of foreign languages

The Academy teaches the 11 following languages: 
 Arabic
 Chinese
 English
 French
 German
 Hindi
 Italian
 Korean
 Portuguese
 Spanish
 Turkish
The curriculum of the bachelor's degree programs of the Academy provides for the compulsory study of two foreign languages, students begin to study the second foreign language from the second year.
The Academy assists students in finding a place to practice as part of the educational process, as well as in subsequent employment. Graduates of RFTA, having received a high-quality education in the field of foreign economic activity, work in federal executive bodies, federal services, state corporations, trade representative offices, as well as large private Russian and foreign companies and hold senior positions in them.

Thanks to extensive international contacts, students have the opportunity to study under two-degree programs or to complete internships at universities in China, France, Germany, Great Britain, Italy, Kazakhstan, Mexico, South Korea, Spain, Turkey an other countries.

The Academy is a co-founder of two international network universities: the Russian-French University (founded in 2016) and the Alliance of Russian and Spanish Universities (founded in 2019). RFTA is a member of the Russian-Chinese Association of Economic Universities (since 2021).

Rankings 
In 2021, RFTA took the third place among Russian universities with an enrollment of less than 300 people in terms of the average Unified State Exam score for budget places and the eighth place for extra–budgetary places.

According to the level of salaries of young professionals in the "Superjob for students" rating, RFTA ranks third in the field of Economics and Finance and ninth in the legal field.

According to the level of demand for graduates, according to the hh.ru 2020 – 2021, graduates of the Law Faculty of the Academy occupy the third place among graduates of Moscow law faculties.

Sources 
 Official website

 English version of the website

Universities and colleges in Moscow
1931 establishments in the Soviet Union
Universities and institutes established in the Soviet Union
Foreign trade of Russia